Carl Hiaasen (born March 12, 1953) is an American journalist and novelist. He began his career as a newspaper reporter and by the late 1970s had begun writing novels in his spare time, both for adults and for young-adult readers. Two of his novels have been made into feature films.

Hiaasen's adult novels are humorous crime thrillers set in Florida. They feature casts of eccentric, sometimes grotesque characters and satirize aspects of American popular culture. Many of the novels include themes related to environmentalism and political corruption in his native state.

Early life and education
Hiaasen was born in 1953 and raised in Plantation, Florida, then a rural suburb of Fort Lauderdale. He was the first of four children born to Odel and Patricia Hiaasen. He has Norwegian and Irish ancestry. He started writing at age six when his father bought him a  typewriter for Christmas.  After graduating from Plantation High School in 1970, he entered Emory University, where he contributed satirical humor columns to the student-run newspaper The Emory Wheel. In 1972, he transferred to the University of Florida, where he wrote for The Independent Florida Alligator. Hiaasen graduated in 1974 with a degree in journalism.

Journalism
Hiaasen was a reporter at TODAY (Cocoa, Florida) for two years before being hired in 1976 by the Miami Herald, where he worked for the city desk, Sunday magazine and award-winning investigative team. Hiaasen was a columnist for the newspaper from mid-1985 until he retired in  March 2021. His columns have been collected in three published volumes, Kick Ass (1999), Paradise Screwed (2001) and Dance of the Reptiles (2014), all edited by Diane Stevenson.

His only brother was Rob Hiaasen, an editor and columnist at The Capital newspaper in Annapolis, Maryland, who was killed in the mass shooting at the newspaper's office on June 28, 2018. Carl Hiaasen's 1991 novel Native Tongue carries the dedication "For my brother Rob."

Novelist 
After becoming a reporter, Hiaasen began writing novels in his spare time. The first three were co-authored with his friend and fellow journalist William Montalbano: Powder Burn (1981), Trap Line (1982), and A Death in China (1984). His first solo novel, Tourist Season (1986), featured a group of ragged eco-warriors who kidnap the Orange Bowl Queen in Miami. The book's main character was whimsically memorialized by Jimmy Buffett in a song called "The Ballad of Skip Wiley," which appeared on his Barometer Soup album.

In all, twenty of Hiaasen's novels and nonfiction books have been on the New York Times Best Seller lists. His work has been translated into 34 languages. In 2016, his novel Razor Girl was short-listed for the Bollinger Everyman Wodehouse award for comic fiction in England.

An earlier Hiaasen novel, Strip Tease, was adapted into a 1996 feature film starring Demi Moore and Burt Reynolds. Another book, Bad Monkey, is being adapted for a series on Apple TV.  It will star Vince Vaughn and is being written and executive produced by Bill Lawrence, who co-created Ted Lasso. The series is tentatively scheduled to begin airing in mid-2023. 

Hiaasen's first venture into writing for younger readers was the 2002 novel Hoot, which was named a Newbery Medal honor book. It was adapted as a 2006 film of the same name (starring Logan Lerman, Brie Larson and Luke Wilson).  The movie was written and directed by Wil Shriner. Jimmy Buffett provided songs for the soundtrack, and appeared in the role of Mr. Ryan, a middle school teacher.

Hiaasen's subsequent children's novels were Flush, Scat; Chomp and, Skink-- No Surrender, which introduces one of his most popular adult characters to teen readers. In 2014, Skink was long-listed for a National Book Award in Young People's Literature. All of Hiaasen's books for young readers feature environmental themes, eccentric casts and adventure-filled plots. His latest, Squirm,  which is set in Florida and Montana, was published in the fall of 2018 and opened at #4 on the New York Times bestseller list for middle-grade novels.

His latest adult book, Squeeze Me, was published on August 25, 2020, and debuted at #2 on the New York Times Combined Print and E-Book Print Best Sellers List.  The novel takes place during the glitzy Palm Beach social season, and features wild pythons and a fictional, well-fed U.S. president who has a vacation mansion on the island. Amazon and the Washington Post listed Squeeze Me as one of the best novels of 2020.

Hiaasen's most recent nonfiction work is Assume the Worst: The Graduation Speech You'll Never Hear, which was published in April 2018 and illustrated by Roz Chast, who is well-known for her cartoons in The New Yorker.

During the 1990s Hiaasen co-wrote the lyrics of three songs with his good friend and famed L.A. rocker, the late Warren Zevon. "Rottweiler Blues" and "Seminole Bingo" appeared on Zevon's Mutineer album in 1995. The third song they wrote together, "Basket Case," was done in conjunction with Hiaasen's novel of the same name, and appeared in 2001 on Zevon's album My Ride's Here.

In addition to being a prolific writer, Hiaasen is also a talented fly fisherman. His fishing career includes six wins of the prestigious Invitational Fall Fly Bonefish Tournament in Islamorada, fishing with famed guide Tim Klein.

Works

Fiction

Adult fiction 

Tourist Season (1986)
 Double Whammy (1987)
 Skin Tight (1989)
 Native Tongue (1991)
 Strip Tease (1993) (filmed in 1996 as Striptease by Andrew Bergman, starring Demi Moore and Burt Reynolds)
 Stormy Weather (1995)
 Naked Came the Manatee  (1996) (A Mystery Thriller Parody with 12 other authors)
 Lucky You (1997)
 Sick Puppy (2000)
 Basket Case (2002)
 Skinny Dip (2004)
 Nature Girl (2006)
 Star Island (2010)
 Bad Monkey (2013)
 Razor Girl (2016)
 Squeeze Me (2020)

With William Montalbano
 Powder Burn (1981)
 Trap Line (1982)
 A Death in China (1984)

Fiction for young readers 
 Hoot (2002)  (released as a movie in May 2006 by director Wil Shriner)
 Flush (2005)
 Scat (2009) 
 Chomp (2012)
 Skink - No Surrender (2014) (young adult novel featuring a recurring hero from his adult fiction series)
Squirm (2018)

Short stories 
 "Tart of Darkness" (2003, Sports Illustrated Swimsuit Issue)
 The Edible Exile (2013)

Non-fiction 
 Team Rodent: How Disney Devours the World (1998)
 Kick Ass: Selected Columns  (1999)
 Paradise Screwed: Selected Columns (2001)
 The Downhill Lie (2008)
 Dance of the Reptiles: Selected Columns (2014)
 Assume the Worst: The Graduation Speech You'll Never Hear (2018)

Collections 
 A Carl Hiaasen (2000) (an audiobook set containing Tourist Season, Stormy Weather, and Strip Tease)
34 books in total

Awards and achievements 

Journalist
 1980: National Headliners Award from Sigma Delta Chi.
 1980: Heywood Broun Award from Newspaper Guild.
 2004 : Damon Runyon Award from the Denver Press Club.
 2010 : Ernie Pyle Lifetime Achievement Award from the National Society of Newspaper Columnists.

Writer
 2003 : Newbery Honor from the Association for Library Service to Children, for Hoot.
 2005 : Rebecca Caudill Young Readers' Book Award, for Hoot.
 2005 : Dagger Awards Nominee - Best Novel, for Skinny Dip.
 2009 : Sélection prix Nouvel Obs et BibliObs du roman noir, for Croco-deal (Nature Girl).
 2011 : Prix du Livre Environnement de la Fondation Veolia Environnement - Mention jeunesse, for Panthère (Scat).
 2011 : Prix Enfantaisie du meilleur roman, for Panthère (Scat).
 2012 : Prix Barnes & Noble du meilleur roman jeunesse, for Chomp.
 2013 : Prix Science en toutes lettres from The Académie de Rouen, for Panthère (Scat).
 2014 : National Book Award Longlist Selection - Young People's Literature, for Skink : No Surrender.
 2017 : Marjorie Harris Carr Award for Environmental Advocacy from the Florida Defenders of the Environment

References

External links 

 
 Hiaasen's columns in The Miami Herald
 
 
 Roger Nichols of Modern Signed Books interviews Carl Hiaasen about his latest novel, Razor Girl
 
 Hiaasen interviewed about his book 'Assume the Worst'  

 

1953 births
20th-century American male writers
21st-century American male writers
20th-century American non-fiction writers
21st-century American non-fiction writers
20th-century American novelists
21st-century American novelists
American children's writers
American crime fiction writers
American columnists
American humorists
Emory University alumni
Environmental fiction writers
Miami Herald people
Living people
University of Florida alumni
Absurdist fiction
Agatha Award winners
Dilys Award winners
Newbery Honor winners
People from Plantation, Florida
Writers from Miami
American people of Irish descent
American people of Norwegian descent
American male novelists
Novelists from Florida
American male non-fiction writers
Plantation High School alumni
People from Vero Beach, Florida